Moctar Touré is a Senegalese professor of Agricultural & Nutritional Sciences. He is a Founding member of the African Academy of Sciences, Senegalese National Academy of Science and the Vice President of The World Academy of Sciences representing African region. He was a former director of the National Rice Research Centre of the Senegalese Institute for Agricultural Research (ISRA) and he was also  a director of the Department of Agricultural and agro-industrial research at the Ministry of Sciences and Technology.

Early life education 
Touré was born on May 14, 1944. He obtained his first degree in 1967 from University of Orleans where he studied Biology and Natural Sciences. In 1970,  he obtained his Masters degree from University of Rennes where he studied  agronomy and soil science. In 1973, he obtained his PhD from the same university where he studied Soil Science

Research areas 
Touré focused on the fields of agronomy, soil chemistry, desertification and sustainable land management.

Career 
From 1974-1988, Touré was a scientist and science manager in the Senegalese agricultural research system. He proceeded to work with World Bank at the Global Environment Facility headquarters in Washington, D.C. where he retired in 2006 as the Team Leader of the Land and Water Resources unit of the Global Environmental Facility (GEF).

References 

Senegal-related lists
University of Orléans alumni
University of Rennes alumni
Fellows of the African Academy of Sciences
Founder Fellows of the African Academy of Sciences
TWAS fellows
1944 births
Living people